Agdistis halodelta is a moth of the family Pterophoridae. It is known from the Iberian Peninsula, North Africa and Israel.

External links

Faunistische Daten zur Verbreitung der Pterophoridae auf der Iberischen Halbinsel (Lepidoptera: Pterophoridae)

Agdistinae
Moths described in 1925